Kamenka is a rural locality (a khutor) in Dyakonovskoye Rural Settlement, Uryupinsky District, Volgograd Oblast, Russia. The population was 51 as of 2010.

Geography 
Kamenka is located on the left bank of the Kamenka River, 10 km southeast of Uryupinsk (the district's administrative centre) by road. 2-y Dyakonovsky is the nearest rural locality.

References 

Rural localities in Uryupinsky District